The Strela is a mountain of the Plessur Alps, located between Langwies and Davos in the Swiss canton of Graubünden.

References

External links
 
 Strela on Hikr

Mountains of the Alps
Mountains of Switzerland
Mountains of Graubünden
Two-thousanders of Switzerland
Arosa
Davos